The GP Horsens is an annual one day cycling race held near Horsens, Denmark. It was previously part of the UCI Europe Tour, as a category 1.2 race.

Winners

References

External links

Cycle races in Denmark
UCI Europe Tour races
Recurring sporting events established in 2015
2015 establishments in Denmark
Summer events in Denmark